Black Kids are an American indie rock band. Formed in Jacksonville, Florida in 2006, the group consists of singer/guitarist Reggie Youngblood, keyboardists/backup singers Ali Youngblood and Dawn Watley, bassist Owen Holmes, and drummer Kevin Snow. The Black Kids' debut EP, Wizard of Ahhhs, received favorable critical response in 2007, and was followed by the Partie Traumatic album, which debuted at number five on the UK Albums Chart in July 2008.

History
Black Kids formed in Jacksonville in 2006. The lineup consists of siblings Reggie Youngblood (born September 14, 1977 in the Philippines) (lead vocals and guitar) and Ali Youngblood (born October 15, 1982) (keyboards and backing vocals), Owen Holmes (born August 24, 1980) (bass guitar), Kevin Snow (born May 25, 1979) (drums), and Dawn Watley (born March 1, 1985) (keyboards and backing vocals). Although they initially performed only in Jacksonville, they received national attention after a breakout performance at the Athens Popfest in Athens, Georgia on 11 August 2007, which led to a sudden flurry of coverage in the music press, including NME, Vice, The Guardian, and The Village Voice. The same month, Black Kids' demo EP, Wizard of Ahhhs, was released via free download on their MySpace page. Soon after, Black Kids began working with Quest Management, the company that manages Björk and Arcade Fire. In October, the EP received a favorable review of 8.4 out of 10 from Pitchfork, including a "Best New Music" commendation.

Black Kids participated in the CMJ Music Marathon in New York City in October, earning the band exposure in The New York Times and USA Today. In December the band traveled to London for a brief tour. Rolling Stone called them one of ten "Artists to Watch" for 2008 and the band was also included in the BBC Sound of 2008 poll.

Black Kids toured the United Kingdom in early 2008, including the Vice Live Tour with Friendly Fires and Ipso Facto, a Sons and Daughters tour, and a Kate Nash tour. In April and May, Black Kids toured the United States as an opening act for Cut Copy. The band played the summer festival circuit in the U.S. and the UK, including the Coachella Valley Music and Arts Festival in April, Radio 1's Big Weekend in May , Glastonbury Festival in June, and T in the Park and Camp Bestival in July. Black Kids then headlined an international tour in the U.S. and Europe from June to November.

While in the UK in early 2008 the band recorded their debut album, Partie Traumatic, with producer Bernard Butler, former guitarist of Suede. Their first single, "I'm Not Gonna Teach Your Boyfriend How to Dance with You", was released in the UK on 7 April and debuted at #11 on the UK Singles Chart. "Hurricane Jane", the follow-up single, was released in the UK on 23 June, where it charted at #36. The album Partie Traumatic was released on 7 July in the UK on Almost Gold Recordings, debuting at #5, and was released two weeks later in the US on Columbia Records, debuting at #127.

In 2009, Black Kids performed at the Big Day Out festivals in New Zealand and Australia. They have also toured with Kaiser Chiefs in the U.K. and Mates of State in the U.S. Their song "I'm Not Gonna Teach Your Boyfriend How to Dance with You," was used in a trailer for the movie Fame, and is featured on the soundtrack of the 2009 film Jennifer's Body. "I'm Not Gonna Teach Your Boyfriend How to Dance with You" was also offered as an iTunes Free Download in July 2008. It is also featured as The Twelves remix version in FIFA 09, and was performed on Glee on 10 May 2011. "Hurricane Jane" was also on the playlist of Pro Evolution Soccer 2010.

The band played new songs on their Mini-Tour along Florida as seen on their setlist. The new songs are possible related or at least contain the words 'Trippin', 'Smokes', 'Castles', 'Rude Boys' and 'Weird Hearts'. On a session for XPN2, Owen Holmes, their bassist, acting out as Gospel Music, his solo project, told that the band is still having fun together as friends and enjoying their spare time a little bit, but still, they are writing songs for their second album. In April, their drummer, Kevin Snow, tweeted that "a second album is in the works, hoping we'll be finished soon."

In August 2013, the band started to tour again in Brazil and on the East Coast of the United States. They played "Clocks" and "Wake Up", two new songs. They stated that the album they were recording in 2010 was scrapped, and that they started recording again in early 2013.

After touring in 2013, the band resettled throughout the U.S. and continued writing and performing in side-projects: Reggie created Blunt Bangs and Owen recorded under the moniker Gospel Music, releasing albums via Kill Rock Stars.

In 2015, the band regrouped in Athens and began working on their second album, Rookie. Rookie was co-produced by Andy LeMaster and was recorded at Chase Park Transduction in Athens, Ga. The band announced their second album in the summer of 2017 and released the first single, "Obligatory Drugs." When asked about their absence from the music scene, frontman Reggie Youngblood told Billboard, "It wasn't until 2015 where I felt like we could [make] a record that we would feel good about,". The band continued to preview material from the upcoming album, releasing the single "If My Heart Is Broken," followed by exclusively premiering the video via Playboy. In August, the band released the music video for "IFFY," which was created by TV on the Radio's Kyp Malone.

On 15 September 2017, Rookie was released. The band played a record-release show at Los Angeles' Echoplex the following night, which marked the beginning of their fall U.S. tour.

Discography

Studio albums

Extended plays

Singles

References

Lovejoy, Heather (16 September 2010) Jacksonville pop sensations Black Kids emerge from hibernation The Florida Times-Union

External links
 Official Black Kids website
 

Indie rock musical groups from Florida
Musical groups from Jacksonville, Florida
Musical groups established in 2006
Post-punk revival music groups
2006 establishments in Florida